Abdullah Sallum al-Samarra'i (1932–1996) was an Iraqi Ba'athist politician and leading member of the Arab Socialist Ba'ath Party in Iraq. He was a member of the Regional Command from 1964 to 1970, when he was expelled.

Biography
He was born in the city of Samarra in 1932 to a lower middle class family. He graduated from Baghdad University with a B.A. and an M.A. in Islamic history. Early on he was an active member of the Independence Party, but became a member of the Arab Socialist Ba'ath Party in Iraq in 1956. He was an associate of Saddam Hussein since the 1950s.

al-Samarra'i was one of the leading members of the Ba'ath Party following its November 1963 ousting from power, and became a member of the Iraqi Regional Command in 1964. At the 1969 Regional Congress of the Ba'ath Party in Iraq al-Samarra'i was re-elected as a member of the Iraqi Regional Command, and appointed to a seat in the Revolutionary Command Council (RCC). However, shortly after he was demoted from his post as Minister of Culture and Information to become Minister of State. The following year, in March 1970, al-Samara'i was removed from his seat in the RCC  and the Iraqi Regional Command and became the Iraqi Ambassador to India. Al-Samarra'i was the first victim in a purge against the civilian wing of the party by Hussein.

References

Citations

Bibliography

 

 
 
 

1932 births
1996 deaths
Members of the Regional Command of the Arab Socialist Ba'ath Party – Iraq Region
People from Samarra
Government ministers of Iraq
Ambassadors of Iraq to India